Howard Jenkins (born 1952/53) is an American billionaire businessman, the son of George W. Jenkins, the founder of Publix Super Markets, and its chairman and CEO from 1990 to 2001. His family is among the richest in Florida and thirty-ninth richest in America, according to Forbes, with a net worth of $8.8 billion in 2020.

Early life
He is the son of George W. Jenkins, the founder of Publix Super Markets. He has a degree from Emory University.

Career
Jenkins was chairman and CEO of Publix from 1990 to 2001.

Personal life
Jenkins is married, with two children, and lives in Tampa, Florida. His wife works for Apollo Environmental, which specializes in "hazardous materials consulting and analysis".

Philanthropy
Howard and Patricia Jenkins donated $10 million to the University of Tampa, which both their children attended, and a residence hall will be named in their honour.

References

1950s births
Living people
American billionaires
American businesspeople
People from Tampa, Florida
Emory University alumni
University of Tampa